Heteronotia is a genus of geckos, lizards in the family Gekkonidae. The genus is endemic to Australia. Species in the genus Heteronotia are commonly known as prickly geckos.

Species
The following five species are recognized as being valid.
Heteronotia atra  – black Pilbara gecko
Heteronotia binoei  – Bynoe's gecko, prickly gecko
Heteronotia fasciolata  – pale-headed gecko
Heteronotia planiceps  – Bynoe's prickly gecko
Heteronotia spelea  – cave prickly gecko, Pilbara cave gecko, desert cave gecko

Note: a binomial authority in parentheses indicates that the species was originally described in a genus other than Heteronotia.

References

Further reading
Wermuth H (1965). "Liste der rezenten Amphibien und Reptilien, Gekkonidae, Pygopodidae, Xantusiidae ". Das Tierreich 80: 1–246. (Heteronotia, new genus). (in German).

 
Lizard genera
Geckos of Australia